Teniente Ramon A. Ayub Gonzalez Airport  is an international airport serving Encarnación, capital of the Itapúa Department of Paraguay. It is located around 14 km from the center of Encarnación, situated in the Capitan Miranda district.

History
The airport belongs to the Municipality of Encarnación, and was constructed nearby the Yacyretá Dam. Initially, projects were planned for flights to Asunción and Buenos Aires.

2010s
The airport was habilitated in 2013. On 4 January 2013, it was reported that the first commercial flight would arrive at Encarnación on 15 January from Resistencia, Argentina. On 6 January 2013, ABC reports that the Intendent of Encarnación, Juan Smalko, informs of the habilitation of Encarnación's Airport to operate national and international flights. The habilitation serves for small air planes, which can be private or public. Juan Smalko informs that the airport operates flight during the day time but would soon be implementing a regular line of flights, with an Argentine airline. On 15 January 2013, it is said that the route from Asunción to Encarnación will become the second domestic route to operate regularly in Paraguay, in addition to the Asunción-Ciudad del Este route which is operate by TAM Mercosur.

On 19 January 2013, it is reported that the first international flight descends at Encarnación's Airport, arriving from Bahia, Brazil. TAGUA operated to Asunción's Silvio Pettirossi Airport as of 10 November 2014. On 12 January 2016 the airport was officially habilitated for night flights by DINAC, after a system of runway lights had been installed.

2020s
In March 2020, ampliation of the airport was announced, including to the landing runway to 500 metres. The airport continued operation during the COVID-19 pandemic quarantine. In December 2020, the president of the DINAC planned to realize investments to better the airport's infrastructure. For 2020, it closed with a total of 1, 346 flights.

Statistics
As of 2013, the airport had an average of two to three flights per day.

Airlines and destinations

Normally this airport is served by Sol del Paraguay, an airline that flies almost daily flights to Asunción. However, due to the COVID-19 pandemic the flights have been suspended for the time being.

See also

 List of airports in Paraguay
 Transport in Paraguay

References

Itapúa Department
Airports in Paraguay